Rudi Keil (born 8 December 1977, in Johannesburg, South Africa) is a rugby union centre.

Keil moved to Sale from Gloucester. One of Keil's best performances for Gloucester was when he scored 2 tries against Saracens on 4 November 2006. He signed with French club Nice in 2011. He is also now eligible to play for the United States national rugby union team.

Guinness Premiership Rugby - 4 years
Experience in Heineken Cup, Guinness Premiership, EDF
South Africa Under-21/Under-23
Super 12/Super 14 South Africa –Promising Player of the year 03
Currie Cup Champions

References

External links
Sale Sharks profile

1977 births
Living people
Gloucester Rugby players
Rugby union centres
Sale Sharks players
Golden Lions players
Sharks (Currie Cup) players
Sharks (rugby union) players
Eastern Province Elephants players
Rugby union players from Johannesburg